A' (A + apostrophe) may be:
 the compose key sequence for Á (A + acute accent)
 a''', one of the determiners in Scottish Gaelic grammar
 [[A' (album)|A' (album)]], a 2004 music album

 See also 
 Aʼ (A + modifier apostrophe)
 A′ (A + prime)
 Aʻ (A + ʻokina)
 Ả (A + hook above)
 ẚ (a + right half ring)
 Aʿ (A + left half ring)
 À (A'' + grave accent)